Northern Light was an American clipper ship. In 1853 she sailed from San Francisco, California to Boston, Massachusetts via Cape Horn with Captain Freeman Hatch at the helm in a record-setting 76 days, 6 hours. The record still stands for a single hull vessel. In 1993 the record was soundly broken by a multi-hull sailing vessel Great American II with no cargo. Sailing around Cape Horn (the southernmost tip of South America) is widely regarded as one of the most challenging routes in yachting, due to extreme weather, strong currents, and a historical reputation for mountainous seas and frequent severe storms.

Construction 
Northern Light was designed by Boston-based naval architect Samuel Hartt Pook and built by the Briggs Brothers in South Boston in 1851.

1853 voyage 
Northern Light left Boston for San Francisco on October 29, 1852 under the command of Captain Freeman Hatch of Eastham, Massachusetts. The return journey was part of a competition with another clipper, Contest, bound for New York.

Contest departed San Francisco for New York on March 12, 1853. Northern Light sailed for Boston the next day. After 38 days Northern Light came within sight of Contest off Cape Horn. Northern Light′s crew signalled and overtook their rival.

Northern Light reached Boston Light on May 29, 1853, after 76 days, 5 hours, arriving in Boston an hour later, two days ahead of Contest′s arrival in New York. It was the shortest run on the  San Francisco-to-Boston passage on record. It also beat previous around-Cape-Horn speed records of 84 days and 85 days held by the New York-based Comet and Flying Dutchman respectively. The Boston Post noted that Northern Light carried no cargo during the passage. The San Francisco-to-Boston sailing record by Northern Light still stands for a single-hull vessel; that feat, accomplished in a time with no electricity, and few navigation aids, no plastics, no synthetic materials for sails or lines, and neither accurate television or radio weather forecasts nor accurate charts and Global Positioning System navigation to demonstrate precise location, is unlikely ever to be repeated.  Nevertheless, in 1993 the multi-hull  trimaran Great American II broke the record and completed the passage in 69 days, 19 hours; she had capsized off San Francisco on an initial attempt.

Later service 

Northern Light made her first transatlantic voyage in 1861, sailing to Le Havre, France, and departed Le Havre bound for New York on December 25, 1861. On January 2, 1862, the ship collided with and sank the French brig Nouveau St. Jacques.
Northern Light was abandoned at sea.

References 
Notes

Sources

External links 
Northern Light, from Clipper Ships in San Francisco: The Maritime Heritage Project

California clippers
Maritime incidents in January 1862
Individual sailing vessels
Ships built in Boston
Shipwrecks in the Atlantic Ocean
Age of Sail merchant ships of the United States
Tall ships of the United States
1851 ships
Ships sunk in collisions
Full-rigged ships
Extreme clippers